747 may refer to:

 747 (number), a number
 AD 747, a year of the Julian calendar
 747 BC, a year in the 8th century BC
 Boeing 747, a large commercial jet airliner

Music and film
 747s (band), an indie band
 747 (album), by country music band Lady Antebellum
 "747" (song), by rock band Kent
 "747 (Strangers in the Night)", a song by Saxon from their 1980 album Wheels of Steel
 747, UK title for 1998 made-for-television movie Blackout Effect

Other uses
 Area code 747, a telephone area code in California
 Big Bud 747, the world's largest farm tractor
 Swingline 747, a model of office stapler
747 Aberdeen Airport–Peterhead, a bus route in Scotland
FC Pskov-747, Russian football club
 List of highways numbered 747
 747 Montreal-Trudeau/Downtown